The Nant Llwydiarth  is a small river in Mid Wales. It flows from the southern flank of Mynydd Hendre-ddu down to Pont Cymerau, north-east of Aberllefenni. Here it joins the Nant Ceiswyn to form the Afon Dulas that flows south to the Afon Dyfi. There was an ancient bridge at Pont Cymerau.

References

Rivers of Gwynedd
Rivers of Snowdonia
Aberllefenni